Doin' My Thang refers to:

"Doin' My Thang", a song by Zion I from True & Livin'
"Doin' My Thang", a song by Shanice from her self-titled album